Mehrangiz is a feminine given name of Persian origin. Notable people with the name include:

 Mehrangiz Dowlatshahi (1919–2008), Iranian social activist and politician
 Mehrangiz Kar (born 1944), Iranian human rights lawyer
 Mehrangiz Manouchehrian (1906–2000), Iranian lawyer and politician
 Mehrangiz Morovvati (born 1962), Iranian politician

Persian feminine given names